Cancilla herrmanni is a species of sea snail, a marine gastropod mollusk, in the family Mitridae, the miters or miter snails.

Distribution
This species occurs in Philippines.

References

herrmanni
Gastropods described in 2014